St. Mary's Church, was a Church of Ireland, church in Donnybrook, Dublin.

The church was consecrated in April 1830 on Anglesea Road. The church was de-consecrated by Archbishop of Dublin Michael Jackson, on July 3rd, 2020. Following the closure of the church the Parish was merged with Irishtown, to form the Irishtown and Donnybrook Union of Parishes, and served by St. Matthew's Parish Church.

In the grounds is the War Memorial Cross, commemorating parishioners who died in the First World War, Second World War and Korean War.

The alter furniture from the Church of Ireland Training College, Kildare Place, was given to St. Mary's following the College of Educations move Rathmine in 1969. It was returned to the college following the churches closure in 2020 and was moved to and rededicated in DCU All Hallows College Chapel, by the Archbishop of Dublin Michael Jackson, for use by Church of Ireland Centre and community there.

Canon Arthur Gore Ryder DD, was the first Rector of Donnybrook (1867-1889) following St. Mary's separation from the archdeaconry of Dublin. Other clergy included Rector Rev. Dr. Robert Walsh and the Rev. Edward (Ted) Ardis. The final Rector of the church was the Rev. John Marchent.

Two ancestors of Meghan Markle, Mary McCue and Thomas Bird, an English soldier, were married at St Mary's church, Donnybrook, in 1860.

References

Church of Ireland churches in Dublin (city)
Former churches in the Republic of Ireland
Chapels in the Republic of Ireland
Donnybrook, Dublin